Ahmad Ali Haidar (born April 10, 1968) is an IFBB professional bodybuilder.

Ahmad is nicknamed, "Abzilla", due to his developed abdominals.  He first started competing in professional bodybuilding in 1997 by competing in the World Championships, where he placed 1st.  His first IFBB competition was the Mr. Olympia of 1998, where he placed 16th.  In 2000, he competed in his first Arnold Classic, placing 12th.  Two years later, in 2002, he competed in another Mr. Olympia, placing 13th. He took a short break in competition after 2007 and returned early 2009 and placed 5th at the Ironman Pro Invitational, which qualifies him for the 2009 Mr. Olympia.

Ahmad has been featured in many fitness and bodybuilding articles, as well as being featured on the cover of Muscular Development magazine.  He currently resides in Beirut, Lebanon.

Competitive stats
Age: 54
Height: 5'7"
Off Season Weight: 250 lb
Competition Weight: 220 lb

Contest history
Year Competition Placing

1997 World Championships Light Heavyweight & Overall, 1st – Best Improved
1998 Mr. Olympia 16th
1999 Ironman Pro Invitational, 9th
2000 Ironman Pro Invitational, 10th
2000 Arnold Schwarzenegger Classic, 12th
2002 Arnold Schwarzenegger Classic 6th
2002 Mr. Olympia 13th
2003 Arnold Classic 7th
2003 Ironman Pro Invitational 7th
2003 San Francisco Pro Invitational 6th
2004 Arnold Classic, 9th
2004 Florida Pro Xtreme Challenge, 2nd
2004 Ironman Pro Invitational, 4th
2004 Night of Champions, 4th
2004 Mr. Olympia, 13th
2004 San Francisco Pro Invitational, 5th
2004 Show of Strength Pro Championship, 9th
2005 New York Pro Championships, 2nd
2005 Toronto Pro Invitational, 3rd
2006 Arnold Classic, 12th
2006 Ironman Pro Invitational, 9th
2006 San Francisco Pro Invitational, 6th
2007 Ironman Pro Invitational, 8th
2007 Sacramento Pro Championships, 4th
2009 Ironman Pro Invitational, 5th
2009 Arnold Classic, 12th

See also
List of male professional bodybuilders
Mr. Olympia
Arnold Classic

References

External links 
 AhmadHaidar.net

1968 births
Living people
Professional bodybuilders
Sportspeople from Beirut
Lebanese bodybuilders
Male bodybuilders